Wittnau is a community in the district of Breisgau-Hochschwarzwald in Baden-Württemberg in Germany.

References

Breisgau-Hochschwarzwald
Baden